Refik Kozić (born 25 December 1951) is a retired Yugoslav professional footballer who played for FK Partizan, and in the NASL between 1980 and 1984 for the Tampa Bay Rowdies. His son Alen Kozić was also a professional player.

Club career
Born in Bačko Novo Selo, SR Serbia, Kozić began his professional career with NK Istra in 1968. He moved to FK Partizan in 1972 where he played in the Yugoslav First League for 8 seasons. In 1980, he signed with the Tampa Bay Rowdies. In November 1983, the New York Cosmos signed Kozić after the Rowdies had waived him two months prior. Kozić played the 1983-84 NASL indoor season with the Cosmos. On 27 April 1984, the Cosmos traded Kozić back to the Rowdies in exchange for Pedro DeBrito.

References

External links
 NASL career stats
 Tampa Bay Rowdies: Refik Kozic

1951 births
Living people
Yugoslav footballers
Serbian footballers
Association football defenders
NK Istra players
FK Partizan players
Yugoslav First League players
North American Soccer League (1968–1984) indoor players
New York Cosmos players
North American Soccer League (1968–1984) players
Tampa Bay Rowdies (1975–1993) players
Yugoslav expatriate footballers
Expatriate soccer players in the United States
Yugoslav expatriate sportspeople in the United States